Esplendor Geométrico is a Spanish industrial band. The band was formed in the early 1980s by Arturo Lanz, Gabriel Riaza, and Juan Carlos Sastre, who had all been members of El Aviador Dro y sus Obreros Especializados. They took the name "Geometric Splendor" from Geometric and Mechanical Splendor and the Numerical Sensibility, a text of the Italian futurist, F.T. Marinetti.

History
In 1981 the band released their first single, "Necrosis en la Poya", in the Tic Tac label, followed by their debut LP, Héroe del Trabajo / El Acero del Partido in 1982. The band was active in the early-eighties international tape scene where they established a rhythmic, experimental electronic sound that foreshadowed the emergence of the powernoise subgenre by over a decade.

In 1985 the band formed their own label, Esplendor Geométrico Discos, and released their second LP, Comisario de la Luz / Blanco de Fuerza.

The band returned with 1997's Polyglophone, the following year, artists such as Coil and Chris and Cosey contributed reworkings of Esplendor Geométrico tracks to the remix album EN-CO-D-Esplendor. In 2002, Compuesto de Hierro was released, while a double CD compilation, Anthology 1981-2003, hit the shops in 2005.

Discography
 Necrosis en la poya 7" (1981, reissued in 2020)
 EG-1 cassette (1981, reissued on CD in 2000)
 El acero del partido/Héroe del trabajo LP (1982, reissued on CD in 2000)
 Comisario de la luz/Blanco de fuerza LP (1985)
 1980-1981 cassette (1986)
 En Roma cassette (1986) 
 En directo: Madrid y Tolosa cassette (1987)
 Kosmos kino LP (1987, reissued on CD in 1996)
 Mekano-turbo LP (1988, reissued on CD in 1994)
 Madrid mayo '89 cassette (1989)
 Live in Utrecht LP (1990, reissued on CD in 1999)
 Diez años de esplendor 2 x cassette (1990)
 Sheikh Aljama (jeque de aljama) CD (1991)
 1980-1982 2 x cassette (1993)
 Arispejal astisaró (powerful metal) CD (1993)
 Veritatis splendor CD (1994)
 1983-1987 CD (1994)
 Nador CD (1995)
 Tokyo sin fin CD (1996)
 Treinta kilómetros de radio CD-EP (1996)
 Balearic rhythms CD (1996)
 80s tracks CD (1996)
 Tarikat 2 x CD (1997)
 Polyglophone CD (1997)
 Syncrotrón mini-LP (1998)
 EN-CO-D-Esplendor (remixes) CD (1998)
 Compuesto de hierro CD (2002)
 Moscú está helado (remixes) CD (2004)
 Anthology 1981-2003 2 x CD (2005)
 8 traks & live CD / DVD (2007)
 Pulsión CD (2009)
 Desarrollos geométricos CD (2011)
 Ultraphoon CD (2013)
 Fluida Mekaniko CD (2016)
 40 Años Nos Iluminan 2 x CD (2020)
 Cinética CD (2020)

References

External links

 
 
 
 Arturo Lanz RBMA lecture

Spanish electronic music groups
Spanish industrial music groups
Musical groups established in 1980
Spanish musical groups
Musical groups from Madrid
Noise musical groups
Cassette culture 1970s–1990s